The 55th Utah State Legislature was elected Tuesday, November 5, 2002 and convened on Monday, January 20, 2003.

Dates of sessions
2003 General Session: January 20, 2003 - March 5, 2003
2003 First Special Session: May 21, 2003 and June 18, 2003
2003 Second Special Session: November 19, 2003
2004 General Session: January 19, 2004 - March 3, 2004
2004 Third Special Session: June 28, 2004
2004 Fourth Special Session: September 15, 2004

Officers

Utah State Senate

Utah State House of Representatives

Leadership

Utah Senate

 President of the Senate: L. Alma Mansell (R-9)

Majority (Republican) Leadership

 Majority Leader: Michael G. Waddoups (R-6)
 Majority Whip: John L. Valentine (R-14)
 Assistant Majority Whip: Peter C. Knudson (R-17)
 Senate Rules Committee Chair: Lyle W. Hillyard (R-25)

Minority (Democratic) Leadership

 Minority Leader: Mike Dmitrich (D-27)
 Minority Whip: Ron Allen (D-12)
 Assistant Minority Whip: Gene Davis (D-3)
 Minority Caucus Manager:

Utah House of Representatives
 Speaker of the House: Martin R. Stephens (R-6)

Majority (Republican) Leadership

 Majority Leader: Greg Curtis (R-49)
 Majority Whip: Jeff Alexander (R-62)
 Assistant Majority Whip: Michael R. Styler (R-68)
 House Rules Committee Chair:

Minority (Democratic) Leadership

 Minority Leader: Brent H. Goodfellow (D-29)
 Minority Whip: Brad King (D-69)
 Assistant Minority Whip: Karen Morgan (D-46)
 Minority Caucus Manager: Patricia W. Jones (D-40)

Utah State Senate

Make-up

Members

Utah State House of Representatives

Make-up

Members

References

Legislature
55
2000s in Utah
2003 in Utah
2004 in Utah
2003 U.S. legislative sessions
2004 U.S. legislative sessions